The Calcutta Group was a group of modern artists in India, formed in 1943 in Kolkata. It has the distinction of being the first artistic movement of its kind in both Bengal and all of India. Though short-lived – the group disbanded in 1953 – the Calcutta Group was instrumental in the transformation of contemporary Indian art and brought this genre onto the world stage.

Members

Core Members (1943) 

 Subho Tagore
 Nirode Mazumdar
 Rathin Moitra
 Prankrishna Pal
 Gopal Ghosh
 Paritosh Sen
 Pradosh Das Gupta 
 Kamala Das Gupta

Additional Members 

 Abani Sen (1947)
 Gobardhan Ash (1950)
 Sunil Madhav Sen (1952)
 Hemant Misra (1950)

Formation 
Subho Tagore, nephew of Abanindranath Tagore and Grand-nephew of Rabindranath Tagore, was a budding artist who studied art at the Government College of Art & Craft. After traveling to London for a few years in order to hone his artistic skills, he moved back to India with the idea of creating a group for plastic artists. Along with fellow painters Nirode Mazumdar, Rathin Maitra, Prankrishna Pal and Gopal Ghosh, he formally created the Calcutta Group in 1943. Later that year, another painter, Paritosh Sen, along with sculptors Pradosh Das Gupta, Kamala  Das Gupta joined the society. These eight members were known as the organization's core, as well as the driving force behind it. Over the years, other artists joined the group as well including Abani Sen in 1947, Gobardhan Ash in 1950, Sunil Madhav Sen in 1952, and Hemanta Mistra in 1953.

Philosophy 
During this period of time, Bengal - a state in India, home to many of the group's members -  had been facing many tragedies including wars, famines, massacres, and even the partition of the country. Stemming from these events, the members of the Calcutta Group focused not on aesthetic, but on the social and political realities of the state and nation at the time. Many of the group's members were actually sympathetic towards the Communist Party that was making its way through India and some were even militants themselves. The group's manifesto was a synthesis of all of these ideas that stressed two main points: renouncement of religion in art and creation of opportunities for Indian art to modernize. The first idea was meant to remove the evils of demagoguery and elitism and produce works that focused on the population as a whole. However, the dismissal of works based n Hindu mythology came across as anti-religious and even atheist and therefore shocked many, leading to the moniker "Artistic Scandal".

Sources
 Partha Mitter, Indian Art (Oxford History of Art), Oxford University Press (2001),  - page 193
 Krishna Dutta, Calcutta: A Cultural and Literary History (Cities of the Imagination), Interlink (2003),  - page 233
 Nercam Nicolas, "Le clan des Tagore, de l'École du Bengale au Groupe de Calcutta" Arts asiatiques (tome 60, 2005) - page 16
 Rebecca M. Brown, Art For a Modern India, 1947-1980, Duke University Press (2009),  - page 14

External links
Article on Calcutta Group by Saffronart
 Hilarious treatment of protagonists (exhibition by Paritosh Sen), The Telegraph, 5 May 2006

Indian artist groups and collectives
20th century in Kolkata
1940s in India